Bori Bunder (also known as Bori Bandar) is an area along the Eastern shore line of Mumbai, India.

Background 
This place was used as a storehouse for goods imported and exported from Mumbai. In the local language, 'Bori' mean sack and 'Bandar' means port. It could also be a corruption of 'Bhandaar' meaning store.

Transport 
In the 1850s, the Great Indian Peninsula Railway built its railway terminus in this area and the station took its name as Bori Bunder.

See also 
 Bori Bunder railway station
 Chhatrapati Shivaji Maharaj Terminus

References 

Neighbourhoods in Mumbai